Ilnytskyi, feminine Ilnytska, is a Ukrainian surname. Notable people with this surname include:

 Roman Ilnytskyi (born 1998), Ukrainian footballer
 Taras Ilnytskyi (born 1983), Ukrainian footballer

See also
 
 Ilnicki, a related surname

Ukrainian-language surnames